was twice the Deputy Chief Cabinet Secretary of Japan. He served for the cabinets for Junichiro Koizumi and Yasuo Fukuda.

References

Living people
1941 births
Government ministers of Japan
Place of birth missing (living people)
University of Tokyo alumni